Finn Mac Cool is a 1994 novel by the Irish-American author Morgan Llywelyn. It is based on the Fenian Cycle about the Irish hero Finn Mac Cool and the fianna. Terri Windling described it as "a skilfully crafted Irish novel . . . in the shadowy realm between history and mythology".

References

1994 novels
Novels by Morgan Llywelyn
Novels set in Ireland
Forge Books books